General Philip Honywood (c.1710 – 21 February 1785) was a British army officer who sat in the House of Commons from 1754 to 1784.

Honywood was the fifth son of Robert Honywood and his wife Mary Sandford, daughter of Sir Richard Sandford, Bart. and sister and heiress of Sir Richard Sandford, 3rd Baronet of Howgill Castle. He succeeded his brother to the Marks Hall estate in Essex in 1755.

Military career
He joined the Army as a cornet and rose through the ranks to become a major in 1741. At the Battle of Dettingen in 1743, he received at least twenty-three broadsword wounds and two musket shots which were never removed, distinguishing himself by his personal valour. He was afterwards promoted to a lieutenant-colonelcy in the regiment of his uncle, also Philip Honywood. He took part in the Jacobite Rising of 1745 and was seriously wounded at the skirmish at Clifton in 1745. He was promoted colonel in 1752 and awarded the colonelcy of the 20th Foot in 1755–56 and the 9th Dragoons from 1756 to 1759. He was made major-general in 1758, given the colonelcy of the 4th Horse from 1759 to 1782 and made lieutenant-general in 1760.

He was Governor of Kingston-upon-Hull from 1766 to his death.
 He was finally promoted to full General in 1777 and transferred to be Colonel of the 3rd Dragoon Guards from 1782 to his death.

Parliamentary career
Honywood was elected Member of Parliament for Appleby in 1754 and held the seat until 1784.

Honywood died in 1785 aged 75. He had married Elizabeth Wastell, but their only child, Philip, who was born 27 June 1760, died aged 19. He left his Marks Hall estate worth nearly £6000 per annum to his cousin Filmer Honywood, M.P. for Kent.

References

External links
Portrait of Lieutenant General Philip Honeywood by Thomas Gainsborough
HONYWOOD, Philip (c.1710–85), of Marks Hall, Essex and Howgill Castle, Westmld. at The History of Parliament Online

1710s births
1785 deaths
British Army generals
Members of the Parliament of Great Britain for English constituencies
British MPs 1754–1761
British MPs 1761–1768
British MPs 1768–1774
British MPs 1774–1780
British MPs 1780–1784
3rd Dragoon Guards officers
British Army personnel of the Jacobite rising of 1745
British Army personnel of the War of the Austrian Succession